Atrocity Exhibition is the fourth studio album by American rapper Danny Brown. It was released on September 27, 2016, by Fool's Gold Records and Warp Records. It is primarily produced by English producer Paul White, and features guest appearances from Kendrick Lamar, Ab-Soul, Earl Sweatshirt, B-Real, Kelela, and Petite Noir.

Atrocity Exhibition was supported by three singles: "When It Rain", "Pneumonia", and "Really Doe". The album received widespread acclaim from critics, appearing on the year-end lists of many publications.

Artwork 
The artwork for Atrocity Exhibition was created by Timothy Saccenti. It features a circuit bent image of Danny Brown, who appears to have his skin peeled to bone on his right side.

Release and promotion 
On October 28, 2014, Danny Brown announced that he was working on a new album. On April 25, 2015, when asked if his album was done, Brown responded: "Almost, I took a break from it cause I'm so ahead of schedule with it knowing it ain't coming out no time soon."

On June 10, 2016, Brown revealed on his Instagram that he was "putting the final touches" on his fourth album. On June 14, Brown announced that he had signed a deal to Warp Records. On July 17, Brown stated that his new album would be titled Atrocity Exhibition, taking inspiration from both the Joy Division song of the same name and J. G. Ballard's novel of the same name. On August 16, Brown unveiled the album's track-listing and release date. On September 15, Brown was interviewed by NPR Music. He spoke on the creation process of the album and premiered a song, titled "Rolling Stone". On September 21, Brown debuted the track, called "Tell Me What I Don't Know" during his interview on Zane Lowe's Beats 1 radio show. From September 14 to November 5, 2016, Brown embarked on The Exhibition 2016 Tour with special guests Maxo Kream and Zelooperz. On September 27, Brown released the album three days ahead of its schedule at 3:00 p.m. EST.

Singles 
The album's lead single, "When It Rain", was released on June 14, 2016, alongside its music video. The song was produced by Paul White. The album's second single, "Pneumonia", was released on August 19, 2016, the song features background vocals from Schoolboy Q and production from Evian Christ. A music video for "Pneumonia" was released on October 13, 2016.

On September 19, 2016, Peter Rosenberg of New York City-based radio station Hot 97, premiered a new Danny Brown song, titled "Really Doe", after given permission from Brown. The track features vocals from Kendrick Lamar, Ab-Soul and Earl Sweatshirt, with the production that was handled by Brown's longtime collaborator Black Milk. "Really Doe" was later released as the album's third and final single via digital distribution on September 20. In an interview, Brown revealed that Lamar was responsible for the creation of "Really Doe".

Critical reception

Atrocity Exhibition was met with widespread critical acclaim. At Metacritic, which assigns a normalized rating out of 100 to reviews from professional publications, the album received an average score of 85, based on 31 reviews. Aggregator AnyDecentMusic? gave it 8.1 out of 10, based on their assessment of the critical consensus.

David Jeffries of AllMusic said, "Atrocity Exhibition is Danny Brown at his least diluted, almost unrelentingly grim and completely engrossing". Hugh Leask of Clash said, "Yet beyond this wired mix of post-punk anxiety, splintered techno elements and haunting soul samples, it's Danny Brown's rhyming ability that ultimately sees the LP flourish". A. Harmony of Exclaim! said, "Overall, Atrocity Exhibition is chewy and eclectic, a rich experience that reveals a new surprise with each listen. Years from now, there will still be goodies to unpack". Ben Beaumont-Thomas of The Guardian said, "His voice, agitatedly squawking and yet dainty as a ballerina, is one of contemporary music greatest pleasures. He quotes Outkast's "B.O.B" on Today, and is the true successor to their trailblazing spirit". Kevin Ritchie of Now said, "Thematically he might travel into dark and desperate places, but the idea that one can find salvation in music is made vividly real by the rush of energy that is Atrocity Exhibition". Damien Morris of The Observer said, "Normally you'd change carriages to avoid someone sounding this unhinged, but the 15 dosages Brown dispenses here are worryingly addictive". Matthew Ramirez of Pitchfork said, "Atrocity Exhibition finds Brown back behind the lens, capturing raw emotion with grainy 16mm". Emmanuel Elone of PopMatters said, "As an album, it is both as lovably outrageous as Danny Brown, but also as menacing and impenetrable as his city is. Ultimately, it is this duality that makes Atrocity Exhibition the masterpiece it is". Sheldon Pearce of Spin said, "With help from frequent collaborators Paul White and Black Milk, UK electronic producer Evian Christ, and crate-digging maestro The Alchemist, Brown brings his persistent terrors to life". Steve Yates of Q stated, "The oddball rapper with the humdrum name is carving out a space all of his own". Andy Baber of MusicOMH said, "The whole of Atrocity Exhibition takes Brown's craft to a new level, even if his delivery occasionally grates. It's by far the best thing he's released and confirms his arrival among the rap elite".

Christopher Weingarten of Rolling Stone said, "The fourth album from Detroit's Danny Brown is the year's most thrilling cry for help". Bryce Jones of Slant Magazine said, "The music is dementedly, nihilistically danceable. The propulsion of certain tracks seems designed to irrevocably drag the listener into Brown's contemplative, paranoid psyche and deep-welled emotionality and, though stylized, intimates the horrors he's seen and felt". Scott Glaysher of XXL said, "At times, he comes across as brilliantly unorthodox with flows, genre-crossing beats and meticulously honest lyrics but those unfamiliar with his outré style may be pushed even further away from the album's peculiarity". Nick Hasted of The Independent said, "This fourth album is produced by south London's Paul White, and a shared taste for Talking Heads and especially Joy Division (the LP is named after their song, more than J. G. Ballard's novel) takes it way off the mainstream hip-hop map".

Year-end lists

Industry awards

Commercial performance
Atrocity Exhibition debuted at number 77 on the US Billboard 200, with 7,000 equivalent album units and nearly three million streams, in an abbreviated week.

Track listing
All tracks produced by Paul White, except where noted.

Sample credits
 "Downward Spiral" contains elements from "Oxymoron", written by Alex Genrich, Mani Neumeier and Ulrich Trepte and performed by Guru Guru.
 "Really Doe" contains elements from "Fragments of Crystal", written and performed by Giovanni Cristiani.
 "Lost" contains elements from "Flame of Love", written by Chen Gexin and Taq Qin and performed by Bai Guang.
 "Ain't It Funny" contains elements from "Wervin'", performed by Nick Mason.
 "Golddust" contains elements from "People From Out the Space", performed by Embryo.
 "White Lines" contains elements from "Dry Land", written and performed by Dave Greenslade.
 "Pneumonia" contains elements from "Black Mamba", performed by Cut Hands; and "White Room", written and performed by Raz Mesinai.
 "Dance in the Water" contains elements from "Ungawa Part II (Way Out Guyana)", written by Kim Davis, Min Sanchez, Dany Johnson, Ande Whyland, April Palmeri, Stacey Elkin, Lori Montana, Jean Leider, Ann Magnusen and Wendy Wild and performed by Pulsallama.
 "From the Ground" contains elements from "Sleeping Earth", written and performed by Lol Creme and Kevin Godley.
 "When It Rain" contains elements from "Pot Au Feu", written and performed by Delia Derbyshire.

Charts

References

2016 albums
Danny Brown (rapper) albums
Fool's Gold Records albums
Warp (record label) albums
Albums produced by the Alchemist (musician)
Albums produced by Black Milk